Red Lion is an unincorporated community in New Castle County, Delaware, United States. Red Lion is located at the intersection of Delaware Route 7 and Delaware Route 71, northwest of Delaware City and southwest of New Castle. The community takes its name from a colonial tavern. and lends it name to the Red Lion Hundred.

See also
Red Lion Creek

References

External links

Unincorporated communities in New Castle County, Delaware
Unincorporated communities in Delaware